Park Sung-ho (Hangul: 박성호, 朴成镐; born 17 July 1982) is a South Korean football forward. His previous clubs were Anyang LG Cheetahs, Busan IPark, Daejeon Citizen, Pohang Steelers, Ulsan Hyundai and J1 League side Vegalta Sendai.

On 3 November 2011, he was traded with Kim Dong-hee and Lee Seul-gi of Pohang Steelers.

After a year in Ulsan, Seongnam FC announced him as a new signing on 12th Feb 2017.

Club statistics

References

External links 

1982 births
Living people
Association football forwards
South Korean footballers
South Korean expatriate footballers
FC Seoul players
Korean Police FC (Semi-professional) players
Busan IPark players
Daejeon Hana Citizen FC players
Vegalta Sendai players
Pohang Steelers players
Yokohama FC players
Ulsan Hyundai FC players
K League 1 players
K League 2 players
J1 League players
J2 League players
Expatriate footballers in Japan
South Korean expatriate sportspeople in Japan
Sportspeople from Incheon
Seongnam FC players